Pope Telesphorus was the bishop of Rome from  126 to his death  137, during the reigns of Roman Emperors Hadrian and Antoninus Pius. He was of Greek ancestry and born in Terranova da Sibari, Calabria, Italy.

The Carmelites venerate Telesphorus as a patron saint of the order since some sources depict him as a hermit living on Mount Carmel. He is also a martyr according to the ancient testimony of Irenaeus.

Biography
Telesphorus is traditionally considered as the eighth Bishop of Rome in succession after Peter. The Liber Pontificalis mentions that he had been an anchorite (or hermit) monk prior to assuming office. According to the testimony of Irenaeus (Against Heresies III.3.3), he suffered a "glorious" martyrdom. Although most early popes are called martyrs by sources such as the Liber Pontificalis (dating to the 3rd century at earliest), Telesphorus is the first to whom Irenaeus, writing considerably earlier (c. 180 AD), gives this title, thus making his martyrdom the earliest attested martyrdom of pope after Peter.

Eusebius (Church History iv.7; iv.14) places the beginning of his pontificate in the twelfth year of the reign of Emperor Hadrian (128–129) and gives the date of his death as being in the first year of the reign of Antoninus Pius (138–139).

In Roman Martyrology, his feast is celebrated on 2 January; the Eastern churches celebrate it on 22 February.

The tradition of Christmas Midnight Masses, the celebration of Easter on Sundays, the keeping of a seven-week Lent before Easter and the singing of the Gloria are usually attributed to his pontificate, but some historians doubt that such attributions are accurate.

A fragment of a letter from Irenæus to Pope Victor I during the Easter controversy in the late 2nd century, also preserved by Eusebius, testifies that Telesphorus was one of the Roman bishops who always celebrated Easter on Sunday, rather than on other days of the week according to the calculation of the Jewish Passover. Unlike Victor, however, Telesphorus remained in communion with those communities that did not follow this custom.

The Carmelites venerate Telesphorus as a patron saint of the order since some sources depict him as a hermit living on Mount Carmel.

The town of Saint-Télesphore, in the southwestern part of Canada's Quebec province, is named after him.

See also

List of Catholic saints
List of popes

References

Further reading
Attwater, Donald and Catherine Rachel John. The Penguin Dictionary of Saints. 3rd edition. New York: Penguin Books, 1993. .
Kelly, J.N.D. Oxford Dictionary of Popes. (1986). Oxford, England: Oxford University Press.
 Benedict XVI. The Roman Martyrology. Gardners Books, 2007. .
Chapman, John. Studies on the Early Papacy. Port Washington, NY: Kennikat Press, 1971. .
Fortescue, Adrian, and Scott M. P. Reid. The Early Papacy: To the Synod of Chalcedon in 451. Southampton: Saint Austin Press, 1997. .
Loomis, Louise Ropes. The Book of Popes (Liber Pontificalis). Merchantville, NJ: Evolution Publishing.

External links

(Latin) The Works of Pope Telesphorus (from Documenta Catholica Omnia)
"Pope St. Telesphorus" Catholic Encyclopedia

137 deaths
2nd-century archbishops
2nd-century Christian saints
2nd-century Romans
Saints from Roman Italy
Greek popes
Italian popes
Papal saints
People from the Province of Cosenza
Popes
Year of birth unknown
2nd-century popes
Burials at St. Peter's Basilica